Gabriel Gustavo Perrone (born 1965 in Buenos Aires) is a retired Argentine  footballer who currently works as a coach.

Playing career 

As a player, Perrone played as a central defender and he started his career playing for Argentine giants River Plate where he played for two seasons from 1986 to 1988. Then he was transferred to Ferro Carril Oeste, where he stayed for another couple of seasons. He did not have great success as a player his career was ended by a Cruciate ligament injury after playing in the lower leagues with Atlanta and CD FAS of El Salvador.

Coaching career 

Perrone started his work as a football coach as the assistant manager to Carlos Griguol and then Daniel Bertoni for a number of top division teams in Argentina such as Gimnasia y Esgrima de La Plata and River Plate.

Perrone took the step up to first team coaching in Ecuador managing with relative success teams like Olmedo and Deportivo Cuenca. In the city of Riobamba coaching a very modest Olmedo he finished fourth at the end of the 2006 season, he was then hired by Deportivo Cuenca for the next two seasons. In Cuenca he managed to make his team a contender for the title and to qualify for the 2008 Copa Libertadores. In the 2008 season he was having a pretty good year qualifying early to the final stages of the Ecuadorian championship, but the club's financial problems were unsustainable and he resigned as its manager. Soon after he left many of his players followed him. It is said that when he left the club owed him hundreds of thousands of dollars in unpaid salary.

Soon after he left Deportivo Cuenca, he initiated negotiations with Ecuadorian giants Emelec.  Rumors were quickly dissipated and the club announced Perrone as its new coach for the next two seasons. Along with Perrone Emelec hired many of Deportivo Cuenca's best players like Javier Klimowicz, Marcelo Fleitas, Polo Wila, and Mariano Mina.

Perrone's teams are usually very organized and conservative, taking few risks in defense and being extremely effective in attack.  He is also very famous in Ecuador for having good vision and hiring unknown players that end up playing well.

Before Ecuador's National Team officialized Sixto Vizuete as its head coach, the Ecuadorian press considered Perrone as the first candidate to take that job.

In 2011 Perrone became the coach of Rangers of Talca, team which was playing in Second Division of Chile, getting the second place of the championship, and then, go up to the Football First Division of Chile since 2012.

Personal life 

Perrone is married with one of the daughters of famous Argentine coach Carlos Griguol. He acted as a mentor for Perrone's coaching career and has even visited Perrone during some of his spells as coach in many of his teams.

In January 2008 he had to be taken to a hospital for severe chest pains caused by stress. He stayed in the hospital in Cuenca for a couple of days after a cardiac problem was ruled out.

References

External links 
 

1965 births
Living people
Footballers from Buenos Aires
Argentine footballers
Argentine expatriate footballers
Club Atlético River Plate footballers
Ferro Carril Oeste footballers
Club Atlético Atlanta footballers
C.D. FAS footballers
Argentine Primera División players
Argentine football managers
C.S. Emelec managers
C.D. Cuenca managers
San Martín de San Juan managers
Expatriate footballers in El Salvador
Expatriate football managers in Chile
Expatriate football managers in Ecuador
Rangers de Talca managers
Association football defenders
Guayaquil City F.C. managers
C.D. Olmedo managers